Haruhisa (written: 晴久 or 治久) is a masculine Japanese given name. Notable people with the name include:

 (1514–1561), Japanese daimyō
 (born 1951), Japanese religious leader and businessman
 (born 1957), Japanese footballer

See also: 

Japanese masculine given names